The 1973 North Bedfordshire Borough Council election took place on 10 May 1973 to elect members of North Bedfordshire Borough Council in England. This was the same day as other local elections.

Overall Results

A total of 32,885 valid votes were cast.
The turnout was 37.8%

After the election the composition of the council was:

Ward Results

Cauldwell

De Parys

Goldington

Harpur

Kingsbrook

Newnham

Queens Park

Bromham

Oakley

Carlton & Harrold

Felmersham & Sharnbrook

Knotting & Souldrop

Swineshead

Riseley

Roxton

Kempston Rural

Wootton

Turvey

Kempston

Clapham

Eastcotts

Great Barford

Renhold

Wilshamstead

References

Bedford District Council
Bedford District Council election
1973
Bedford District Council 1973